Thor Henning (13 September 1894 – 7 October 1967) was a Swedish breaststroke and freestyle swimmer who won a four medals at the 1912, 1920 and 1924 Summer Olympics. At the 1912 Summer Olympics he came second after German Walter Bathe in the 400 m breaststroke, and in 1920 he was beaten by teammate Håkan Malmrot in the 200 m and 400 m breaststroke.

See also
 List of members of the International Swimming Hall of Fame

References

1894 births
1967 deaths
Swedish male breaststroke swimmers
Swedish male freestyle swimmers
Olympic swimmers of Sweden
Swimmers at the 1912 Summer Olympics
Swimmers at the 1920 Summer Olympics
Swimmers at the 1924 Summer Olympics
Olympic silver medalists for Sweden
Olympic bronze medalists for Sweden
Olympic bronze medalists in swimming
SK Neptun swimmers
Medalists at the 1924 Summer Olympics
Medalists at the 1920 Summer Olympics
Medalists at the 1912 Summer Olympics
Olympic silver medalists in swimming
19th-century Swedish people
20th-century Swedish people